South Wales East was a European Parliament constituency covering southeastern Wales, including Gwent and parts of Mid Glamorgan.

Prior to its uniform adoption of proportional representation in 1999, the United Kingdom used the first-past-the-post system for the European Parliament elections in England, Scotland and Wales. The European Parliament constituencies used under that system were smaller than the later regional constituencies, and only had one Member of the European Parliament each.

South Wales East replaced the similarly named South East Wales in 1984, and became part of the much larger Wales constituency in 1999.

Boundaries
1984-1994: Blaenau Gwent, Caerphilly, Cynon Valley, Islwyn, Merthyr Tydfil and Rhymney, Monmouth, Newport East, Newport West, Rhondda, Torfaen.

1994-1999: Blaenau Gwent, Caerphilly, Islwyn, Merthyr Tydfil and Rhymney, Monmouth, Newport East, Newport West, Torfaen.

Members of the European Parliament

Results

References

External links
 David Boothroyd's United Kingdom Election Results

European Parliament constituencies in Wales (1979–1999)
1984 establishments in Wales
1999 disestablishments in Wales
Constituencies established in 1984
Constituencies disestablished in 1999